The Branch River, a watercourse of the Mid-Coast Council system, is located in the Mid North Coast and Upper Hunter regions of New South Wales, Australia.

Course and features
The Branch River rises on south west of the settlement of Crawford River, below Girvan, south southwest of Bulahdelah, and flows generally south and then southwest, joined by five minor tributaries, before reaching its confluence with the Karuah River north of Karuah. The river descends  over its  course.

See also

 Rivers of New South Wales
 List of rivers of New South Wales (L–Z)
 List of rivers of Australia

References

External links
 

Rivers of New South Wales
Mid-Coast Council
Rivers of the Hunter Region